Taylor Westermark Curran (born May 19, 1992) is a Canadian field hockey player who plays as a defender or midfielder for West Vancouver and the Canadian national team.

International career
Curran made his debut for the national team in 2009 and he played in the 2010 World Cup. He played for the Canada national field hockey team at the 2015 Pan American Games and won a silver medal. In 2016, he was named to Canada's Olympic team. He was named as a reserve for the 2018 World Cup. In June 2019, he was selected in the Canada squad for the 2019 Pan American Games. They won the silver medal as they lost 5–2 to Argentina in the final.

References

External links
 
 Taylor Curran at Field Hockey Canada
 
 
 
 

1992 births
Living people
Field hockey players from Vancouver
Canadian male field hockey players
Male field hockey defenders
Male field hockey midfielders
2010 Men's Hockey World Cup players
Field hockey players at the 2014 Commonwealth Games
Field hockey players at the 2015 Pan American Games
Field hockey players at the 2016 Summer Olympics
Field hockey players at the 2020 Summer Olympics
Field hockey players at the 2018 Commonwealth Games
Field hockey players at the 2019 Pan American Games
Olympic field hockey players of Canada
Pan American Games silver medalists for Canada
Pan American Games medalists in field hockey
West Vancouver Field Hockey Club players
Medalists at the 2015 Pan American Games
Medalists at the 2019 Pan American Games
Commonwealth Games competitors for Canada